Los Robles may refer to:
 Los Robles, La Rioja, Argentina
 Los Robles La Paz in Colombia
 Los Robles Archaeological District, Arizona, United States
 Los Robles Hospital & Medical Center, California, United States
 Los Robles Ave, Major street in Pasadena, California, United States
 House at 1240 North Los Robles a U.S. National Register of Historic Places 
 Los Robles the home of California Governor Stoneman Adobe, Los Robles

 Robles is Spanish for "oaks".

See also 
 Robles (disambiguation)